Lee Gohmann Huber (February 16, 1919 – September 22, 2005) was an American basketball player in the National Basketball League (NBL) of the United States, a forerunner to the National Basketball Association.  A 6'0" guard from Louisville, Kentucky, Huber played college basketball for coach Adolph Rupp at the University of Kentucky from 1938 to 1941, where he was named a first-team All-American by the Helms Athletic Foundation in 1941.  After college, Huber played one season in the NBL for the Akron Goodyear Wingfoots, averaging 6.4 points per game.

Huber left basketball after deciding that it would not be a profession that could support his family.  He served for the United States Navy in World War II, then settled into a private business career.  Huber died on September 22, 2005 in Orlando, Florida.

References

External links
NBL stats

1919 births
2005 deaths
Akron Goodyear Wingfoots players
All-American college men's basketball players
American men's basketball players
United States Navy personnel of World War II
Basketball players from Louisville, Kentucky
Guards (basketball)
Kentucky Wildcats men's basketball players